The Vektor R4 is a 5.56×45mm assault rifle designed in 1979 based on the IMI Galil rifle. It entered service as the standard service rifle of the South African Defence Force (SADF) in 1980. The R4 replaced the R1, a variant of the 7.62×51mm FN FAL. It was produced by Lyttelton Engineering Works (LIW, "Lyttelton Ingenieurswerke"), now Denel Land Systems.

The weapon is a licensed variant of the Israeli IMI Galil assault rifle with several modifications; both the stock and magazine are now made of a high-strength polymer and the stock was lengthened, adapting the weapon for the average South African soldier. Other detailed differences include the R4's lack of a carry handle and a number of improvements made to its internal operating mechanism.

Design details

Operating mechanism
The R4 is a selective fire, gas-operated weapon that fires from a closed bolt. As with the Galil parent weapon, the operating system is derived from that of the AK-47. It uses ignited powder gases channelled through a vent in the barrel to drive a long stroke piston located above the barrel in a gas cylinder to provide power to the operating system. The weapon features a self-regulating gas system and a rotary bolt breech locking mechanism (equipped with two locking lugs), which is rotated by a helical camming groove machined into the bolt carrier that engages a control pin on the bolt. Extraction is carried out by means of a spring-loaded extractor contained in the bolt and a protrusion on the left guide rail inside the receiver acts as the fixed ejector.

Features

The R4 is hammer-fired and uses a trigger mechanism with a 3-position fire selector and safety switch. The stamped sheet steel selector bar is present on both sides of the receiver and its positions are marked with letters: "S"— indicating the weapon is safe, "R"—single-fire mode ("R" is an abbreviation for "repetition"), and "A"—fully automatic fire. The "safe" setting disables the trigger and secures the weapon from being charged.

The R4 is fed from a synthetic box magazine with a 35-round cartridge capacity (designed to use the 5.56×45mm NATO cartridge with the M193 projectile) loaded in a staggered configuration. During the 1980s South African troops were issued with one 50-round magazine as well. The flash suppressor is slotted and doubles as an adapter for launching rifle grenades. Bolted to a bracket in the gas block, under the barrel, is a lightweight folding bipod (folds into the handguard), which includes a wire cutter in the hinge.

The R4 has a side-folding tubular stock, which folds to the right side of the receiver. The rifle's handguard, pistol grip, magazine, stock arms and shoulder pad are all made from a synthetic material, making it lighter in weight than the equivalent original Galil model which uses heavier metal and wood in these components.

For regular field maintenance and cleaning, the firearm is disassembled into the following components: the receiver and barrel group, bolt carrier, bolt, return mechanism, gas tube, receiver dust cover and magazine.

Sights
The rifle has conventional iron sights that consist of a front post and a flip-up rear sight with 300 and 500 m apertures. The front sight is adjustable for windage and elevation and is installed in a durable circular shroud. The rear sight is welded at the end of the receiver's dust cover. For nighttime use, the R4 is equipped with self-luminous tritium light dots (exposed after placing the rear sight in an intermediate position) installed in a pivoting bar to the front sight base, which folds up in front of the standard post and aligns with two dots in the rear sight notch.

Accessories
The R4 is issued with spare magazines, a cleaning kit and sling.

Upgrade
DLS has introduced remanufactured models of the R4, R5, R6 that have Picatinny rails. DLS has also introduced grenade launchers, grips and other underbarrel attachments.

Variants

The South African Navy, South African Air Force, South African Military Health Service, and South African Police Service adopted a short carbine version of the 5.56 mm Galil SAR, which was license-manufactured as the R5. The R5, when compared to the larger R4, has a barrel that is  shorter, together with a shorter gas system and handguard. It also lacks a bipod, and the flash hider does not support rifle grenades.

In the 1990s, an even more compact personal defence weapon variant of the R5 was developed for armoured vehicle crews, designated the R6, which has a further reduced barrel and a shortened gas cylinder and piston assembly.

Denel developed prototypes for the R7 and R8, a heavy barrelled squad automatic weapon and a locally produced Micro-Galil, respectively, but it is unclear whether these entered production.

LIW/DLS also introduced a line of semi-automatic variants of the R4, R5 and R6 called the LM4, LM5 and LM6 respectively, built for civilian and law enforcement users.  The rifles were marketed by Musgrave, with the joint venture between the Lyttelton and Musgrave conferring the rifle's "LM" prefix.

Users
 : Burundian rebels
 
: 15,900 R4/R5s were delivered to Congolese security forces in 1996 and 1997.
 Democratic Forces for the Liberation of Rwanda
 : Eswatini Police
: Used by the Armed Forces of Haiti and Haitian National Police
 
: Malawi Police Service.
: Imported for use in the Rwandan National Army as of 1992. Some captured by the Rwandan Patriotic Front.
: Used by the Special Brigade and by the SAJ.
: Standard issue rifle of the South African National Defence Force. The compact R5 carbine is popular among police and special response units.

See also

Vektor CR-21
RK 62
Zastava M21
List of assault rifles
Israel–South Africa Agreement

Notes

References

Bibliography

External links

5.56 mm assault rifles
Weapons and ammunition introduced in 1980
Kalashnikov derivatives
Light machine guns
Rifles of the Cold War
Infantry weapons of the Cold War
Assault rifles of South Africa
Post–Cold War weapons of South Africa
Cold War firearms of South Africa
Israel–South Africa relations
Denel